Only ten players in the history of the National Basketball Association (NBA) have played 20 or more seasons in their respective careers. In 1985–86, Kareem Abdul-Jabbar broke the previous NBA record of 16 seasons held by Dolph Schayes, John Havlicek,  Paul Silas, and Elvin Hayes; he finished his career in 1988–89 with a then-record 20 seasons played. Robert Parish broke the mark in 1996–97, when he retired after 21 seasons, and Kevin Willis tied him in his final season in 2006–07. They were joined by Kevin Garnett in 2015–16 when he began his 21st season. His Minnesota Timberwolves played their season opener against the Los Angeles Lakers and Kobe Bryant, who became the fifth player to reach the 20-season plateau that night. The game was the first time in league history that two opposing players each had at least 20 years of experience. Having played his entire career with the Lakers, Bryant was also the first NBA player to spend 20 seasons with one team. In 2018–19, Dirk Nowitzki surpassed Bryant with 21 seasons with the Dallas Mavericks. In 2019–20, Vince Carter became the first player with 22 seasons in the NBA. In the NBA, big men typically have longer playing careers than smaller men. Older centers and power forwards may have the luxury of pacing themselves while running the court, or they might station themselves in the post. Big men Parish, Willis, and Garnett all had relatively minor roles while playing in their respective 21st seasons. On the other hand, guards are tasked with handling the ball full-court; in addition, guards are more dependent on traits like speed and quickness that deteriorate with age. Bryant was the first guard to play 20 seasons, passing the previous mark of 19 seasons for guards held by John Stockton and Jason Kidd. In his final season, he was moved to small forward and surrounded by other ball handlers.

Seasons played leaders
Following is a list of players who have played the most seasons in the NBA.

See also

List of National Basketball Association career games played leaders
List of National Basketball Association career minutes played leaders
List of NBA players who have spent their entire career with one franchise
List of oldest and youngest National Basketball Association players

Notes

References
General

Specific

National Basketball Association lists
National Basketball Association statistical leaders